Matt Kasmir is a British visual effects supervisor. He was nominated for an Academy Award in the category Best Visual Effects for the film The Midnight Sky.

Selected filmography 
 The Midnight Sky (2020; co-nominated with Christopher Lawrence, Max Solomon and David Watkins)

References

External links 

Living people
Place of birth missing (living people)
Year of birth missing (living people)
Visual effects artists
Visual effects supervisors